The following is a list of notable deaths in May 1992.

Entries for each day are listed alphabetically by surname. A typical entry lists information in the following sequence:
 Name, age, country of citizenship at birth, subsequent country of citizenship (if applicable), reason for notability, cause of death (if known), and reference.

May 1992

1
Agustin Cueva, 54, Ecuadorian writer, cancer.
Hella Hammid, 70, German-American photographer.
Sharon Redd, 46, American singer, pneumonia caused by AIDS.
Justin Stein, 80, American baseball player.
Celerino Sánchez, 48, Mexican baseball player.

2
Stefano D'Arrigo, 72, Italian writer.
Trevor Hatherton, 67, New Zealand geophysicist, scientific administrator and Antarctic scientist.
Mike Karakas, 80, American ice hockey player.
Stefan Kieniewicz, 84, Polish historian.
Wilbur Daigh Mills, 82, American politician, member of the U.S. House of Representatives (1939–1977).
Kel Tremain, 54, New Zealand rugby player.
Margarete Wallmann, 87-90, Austrian opera director and ballerina.

3
Alummoodan, 59, Indian actor.
Vilma Degischer, 80, Austrian theatre and film actress.
Godman Irvine, 82, Canadian-British politician.
George Murphy, 89, American politician and actor, member of the U.S. Senate (1965–1971), leukemia.

4
Shane Curry, 24, American football player, shot.
August Hellemans, 84, Belgian football player.
Michael Howlett, 77, American politician, kidney failure.
Ronnie Knox, 57, Canadian football player.
Gregor Mackenzie, 64, British politician.
Lyn Marshall, 47, British yoga teacher, ballerina, and actress, brain cancer.
Thomas O. Paine, 70, American engineer and scientist, cancer.

5
Yunis Aliyev, 33, Azerbaijani soldier and war hero, killed in action.
Edmondo Amati, 72, Italian film producer.
Del M. Clawson, 78, American politician, member of the U.S. House of Representatives (1963–1978).
Fikret Hajiyev, 27, Azerbaijani soldier and war hero, killed in action.
Kerim Kerimov, 20, Azerbaijani soldier, killed in battle.
Sarkhan Ojaqverdiyev, 24, Azerbaijani soldier and war hero, killed in action.
Jean-Claude Pascal, 64, French actor, stomach cancer.
Jean Vauthier, 81, French playwright.
Dick Yarmy, 59, American actor (Get Smart, Mork & Mindy, Emergency!), lung cancer.

6
Marlene Dietrich, 90, German-American actress (Morocco, Touch of Evil, Judgment at Nuremberg), kidney failure.
Malcolm A. MacIntyre, 84, American lawyer and hall of fame lacrosse player.
Gaston Reiff, 71, Belgian Olympic runner (1948).
Jilly Rizzo, 75, American restaurateur and actor, traffic collision.
Tatyana Yesenina, 73, Soviet writer.

7
Nachhatar Chhatta, 32, Indian singer, alcohol intoxication.
Kiril Hristov, 42, Bulgarian football player.
Soerip, 70, Indonesian singer and film actress.
Tiny Timbrell, 75, Canadian musician.

8
Albert Agarunov, 23, Azerbaijani soldier and war hero, killed in action.
Addeke Hendrik Boerma, 80, Dutch civil servant.
Richard Derr, 74, American actor (When Worlds Collide, American Gigolo, Firefox), pancreatic cancer.
Gul Mohammad, 70, Pakistani cricketer, liver cancer.
Sergey Obraztsov, 90, Russian puppeteer.
Otto Šimánek, 67, Czechoslovak actor.

9
Hernán Bolaños, 80, Nicaraguan-Costa Rican football player.
Keith Bissell, 80, Canadian composer.
Tom Chessell, 78, Australian rower and Olympic medalist.
Carmine Lombardozzi, 79, American mobster and member of the Gambino crime family.
Mehman Sayadov, 19, Azerbaijani soldier and war hero, killed in action.

10
Egil Endresen, 72, Norwegian judge and politician.
John Lund, 81, American actor (A Foreign Affair, To Each His Own, The Perils of Pauline).
Werner Nilsen, 88, Norwegian-American soccer player.
K. G. Ramanathan, 71, Indian mathematician.
Sylvia Syms, 74, American singer, heart attack.
Willard Long Thorp, 92, American economist.

11
Judith Brown, 60, American dancer and sculptor.
René Guajardo, 59, Mexican professional wrestler, liver cancer.
Loretta Cessor Manggrum, 95, American pianist and composer of sacred music.
William A. Mueller, 91, American sound engineer.
Curtis D. Summers, 62, American engineer and roller coaster designer.
Prince Tsuneyoshi Takeda, 83,  Japanese member of the imperial family, heart attack.

12
Joe Burke, 68, American baseball executive, lymphatic cancer.
Nikos Gatsos, 80, Greek poet, translator and lyricist.
Jacqueline Maillan, 69, French actress, heart attack.
Hector McIvor, 91, Australian politician.
Bob Mizer, 70, American photographer and filmmaker.
Lenny Montana, 66, American actor (The Godfather, Fingers), professional wrestler (GCW) and mobster, heart attack.
Robert Reed, 59, American actor (The Brady Bunch, The Defenders, Roots), colon cancer.

13
Patrick Angus, 38, American painter, AIDS.
Gisela Elsner, 55, German novelist, suicide by jumping.
Stan Hugill, 85, British folk music performer.
Dawon Kahng, 61, Korean-American electrical engineer and inventor.
Leon Klatzkin, 77, American music arranger, composer, and conductor.
F. E. McWilliam, 83, Northern Irish sculptor, cancer.
Wanda Rutkiewicz, 49, Polish mountain climber, climbing accident.
Bart Zoet, 49, Dutch cyclist, heart attack.

14
Lyle Alzado, 43, American football player, brain cancer.
Robert Howie, 93, Scottish rugby player.
Frank M. Karsten, 79, American politician, member of the U.S. House of Representatives (1947–1969).
Nie Rongzhen, 92, Chinese general.

15
Tommy Colella, 73, American gridiron football player.
Ladislav Demšar, 63, Yugoslav basketball player and coach.
Jovy Marcelo, 27, Filipino racing driver, racing accident.
Bartlett Mullins, 87, British actor.
Robert Morris Page, 88, American physicist, heart failure.
Valentino Pellarini, 72, Italian basketball player.
Gino Rossetti, 87, Italian football manager and football player.
Jalil Safarov, 30, Azerbaijani soldier, killed in battle.
Parviz Samedov, 22, Azerbaijani soldier, killed in battle.

16
Joe Healey, 81, American hurdler and Olympian.
Marisa Mell, 53, Austrian actress, throat cancer.
Eric James, Baron James of Rusholme, 83, British educator.
Chalino Sánchez, 31, Mexican singer-songwriter, murdered.
Robert Grainger Ker Thompson, 76, British military officer and counter-insurgency expert.

17
Robert Blanc, 47, French footballer.
George Hurrell, 87, American photographer, bladder cancer.
William Ivey, 72, American painter, cancer.
Želimir Vidović, 38, Bosnian football player, murdered.
Lawrence Welk, 89, American musician and television personality (The Lawrence Welk Show), pneumonia.

18
Jake Leicht, 72, American gridiron football player.
Giuliani G. De Negri, 71, Italian film producer and screenwriter.
Jasper K. Smith, 86, American attorney and politician.
Skip Stephenson, 52, American comedian, heart attack.
Marshall Thompson, 66, American actor, heart failure.

19
Esther Averill, 89, American author.
Alfred McClung Lee, 85, American sociologist.
Jock Turner, 48, Scottish rugby player.
Hans Vogt, 81, German composer.

20
Roger Keith Coleman, 33, American convicted murderer, execution by electric chair.
Giovanni Colombo, 89, Italian Cardinal of the Roman Catholic Church.
Leela Sumant Moolgaokar, 75, Indian social worker.
James Tully, 76, Irish politician.
Alicia Vergel, 64, Filipina actress.

21
Ulric Cole, 86, American pianist, editor, music educator and composer.
T. B. Ilangaratne, 79, Sri Lankan politician, author, dramatist, and theater actor.
Åke Lindblom, 73, Swedish sports shooter.
Mugs Stump, 42, American mountaineer, mountaineering accident.

22
Tony Accardo, 86, American mobster and Chicago Outfit boss, cardiopulmonary failure.
Roy Childs, 43, American political essayist, fall.
Elizabeth David, 78, British cookery writer, stroke.
Dan Enright, 74, American television producer, cancer.
Zellig S. Harris, 82, American linguist.
Abraham Moles, 71, French information scientist.
György Ránki, 84, Hungarian composer.
Iosif Varga, 50, Romanian football player.
Lee Yang-ji, 37, Japanese novelist, myocarditis.

23
James Blair, 82, American rower and Olympic champion.
Kostas Davourlis, 44, Greek football player, heart attack.
Giovanni Falcone, 53, Italian magistrate, assassinated, car bomb.
John Gates, 78, American communist politician.
Charley Malone, 81, American gridiron football player.
Francesca Morvillo, 46, Italian magistrate, assassinated, car bomb.
Paul Moukila, 41, Congolese football player, malaria.
Henry George Pearce, 74, Australian politician.
Ernst Plischke, 88, Austrian-New Zealand architect, town planner and furniture designer.
Atahualpa Yupanqui, 84, Argentine musician.

24
Jean Aberbach, 81, Austrian-American music publisher.
Francis Thomas Bacon, 87, English engineer.
Luiz Eça, 56, Brazilian samba and bossa nova pianist.
Joan Sanderson, 79, British actress.

25
Danny Biasone, 83, Italian-American sports executive.
Tulio Demicheli, 77, Argentine filmmaker, cancer.
Sari Dienes, 93,  Hungarian-American artist.
Viktor Grishin, 77, Soviet politician, heart attack.
Philip Habib, 72, American diplomat, cardiac arrhythmia.
Gitta Mallasz, 84, Hungarian artist.
Ruben Zakharian, 90, Russian painter.

26
Edmund Beloin, 82, American writer of radio, film, and television.
Terence Clarke, 88, British Army officer and politician.
Dorota Horzonkówna, 58, Polish Olympic gymnast (1952, 1956).
George Morrow, 66, American jazz bassist.
Geneva Sayre, 80, American bryologist and bibliographer.

27
Machiko Hasegawa, 72, Japanese manga artist.
Peter Jenkins, 58, British journalist, respiratory failure.
Karl Leyser, 71, German-British historian.
John Myhers, 70, American actor (How to Succeed in Business Without Really Trying, 1776, History of the World, Part I), pneumonia.
Delilah Pierce, 88, American artist, curator and educator.
Donald K. Ross, 81, American naval officer, heart attack.
Franz Rupp, 91, German-American pianist.
Jone Salinas, 74, Italian actress.
Michael Talbot, 38, American quantum mystic, lymphoid leukemia.

28
Ricardo Caminos, 75-76, Argentine egyptologist.
Fumio Fujimura, 75, Japanese baseball player.
Bai Hong, 72, Chinese singer.
Godefroid Munongo, 66, Congolese politician.
Lorenzo Tañada, 93, Filipino lawyer, civil rights advocate and politician.

29
Ollie Halsall, 43, English guitarist, drug-induced heart attack.
Yoshitoshi Mori, 93, Japanese artist.
Albert Ndongmo, 65, Cameroonian prelate of the Catholic Church.
Nils-Åke Sandell, 65, Swedish football player and manager.
Ken Suesens, 75, American basketball coach. 
Petro Udovychenko, 78, Ukrainian politician and diplomat.

30
Karl Carstens, 77, German politician, president (1979–1984).
Larry Craig, 75, American football player.
Craig Ellwood, 70, Los Angeles-based modernist architect.
Mitsuharu Inoue, 66, Japanese writer, colorectal cancer.
James Lamy, 64, American bobsledder and Olympic medalist.
Elly Yunara, 68, Indonesian film actress and producer.
Antoni Zygmund, 91, Polish mathematician.

31
Eugene A. Chappie, 72, American politician, member of the U.S. House of Representatives (1981–1987).
Henri Moreau de Melen, 89, Belgian politician.
Walter Neugebauer, 71, Croatian comic book artist and animator.
Lillian Powell, 96, Canadian-American dancer.
Dieter Puschel, 52, German cyclist.
Lutz Stavenhagen, 52, German politician, pneumonia.

References 

1992-05
 05